The  is a museum located in the city of Tokorozawa, Saitama, dedicated to the history of aviation in Japan. It contains aircraft and other displays (many of which are interactive) and an IMAX theatre. Located on the site of Japan's first airfield which started operations in 1911 with a flight by Yoshitoshi Tokugawa, the original single runway is still visible and has been incorporated into a larger multifunction park adjacent to the museum. It is located in the Tokorozawa Aviation Memorial Park.

Aircraft in collection

At any given time the aircraft on display will vary. The NAMC YS-11 and the Curtiss EC-46 Commando are on permanent display in the park, but the collection visible in the museum itself changes. The collection is as follows:

 91-1143 Curtiss EC-46A Commando (outside)
 JA8732 NAMC YS-11 (outside)
 52-0099 North American T-6G Texan
 JG-0001 Sikorsky H-19C Chickasaw
 50002/JG-0002 Piasecki H-21/Ventrol V44A
 25-5856 Fuji T-1
 53-5025 Stinson L-5 Sentinel
 31065/JG-1065 Hughes-Kawasaki OH-6J Cayuse
 60508/JG-0508 Beechcraft T-34 Mentor
 JG-2032 Piper L-21B Super Cub
 40001/JG-0001 Kawasaki KAL-2
 41547/JG-1547 Bell UH-1B Iroquois
 41560 Bell UH-1B Iroquois
 Nakajima Army Type 91 Fighter (fuselage)
 Kaishiki No.1 (replica)
 Farman III 
 30003 Bell H-13E Sioux
 JA3052 Cessna 170B
 JA5170 Cessna T310P
 4253/18 Fokker D.VIII (replica)
 61328 Hughes TH-55J
 30213 Kawasaki-Bell H-13KH
 51734 Kawasaki-Vertol KV-107-II-4
 JA0148 Kirigamine Hato K-14 glider
 JA9549 Mil Mi-8PA Hip
 J-TECH Nieuport 81 E.2
 84-8102 North American F-86D Sabre
 JA3925 Piper J-3C-65 Cub
 S4523 SPAD S.XII (replica)

Temporary displays
In 2013, an airworthy Zero fighter from World War II was exhibited at the museum, on loan from the Planes of Fame Air Museum in California.

In 2016 a replica Nakajima Ki-27 Nate made for the 2015 Asahi TV drama "Tsuma to Tonda Tokkouhei" was displayed at the museum.

Access
The museum is located near Kōkū-kōen Station on the Seibu Shinjuku Line, approximately 30 to 45 minutes from central Tokyo.

See also
List of aerospace museums

References

External links

 

Aerospace museums in Japan
Military and war museums in Japan
Buildings and structures in Tokorozawa, Saitama
Museums in Saitama Prefecture